Tofig Ahmed-agha oglu Bakikhanov is a composer. He was awarded the title People's Artists of the Azerbaijan SSR (1990).

Biography
Tofig Bakikhanov, a descendant of Baku khans, was born on 8 December 1930 in Baku, in the family of Ahmed–agha Bakikhanov, People's Artist of Azerbaijan. He began his musical activity as a violinist. In 1953, Tofig Bakikhanov graduated from the Azerbaijan State Conservatory specializing in violin, where Fikret Amirov was his teacher. In 1957, he majored in music composing, where his teacher was another prominent Azerbaijani composer Gara Garayev.

In 1950-1953, Bakikhanov worked as a violinist in the trio of the Azerbaijan Philharmonic Society. In 1953, he was the teacher and head of the string department of the Zeynally Baku College of Music. In 1966, he managed the department of arts edition and from 1968, the department of note-music literature of the Azernashr publishing house. From 1970, Tofig Bakikhanov began to work as the senior teacher of the department of chamber music and as the dean of the performing program of the Azerbaijan Conservatory.

Creativity
Tofig Bakikhanov is the author of concerts for violin, violoncello, flute, oboe, dual concerts, musical comedies. Now the composer is the professor of Baku Academy of Music. Starting from 1969 till now, Tofig Bakikhanov performed recitals in Paris, Moscow, Tbilisi, Istanbul, Izmir, Tehran and in other cities.

Authorship
"Mammadali is going to resort" (with Mammadov, Baku, 1968)
"One of six" operetta (with Mammadov, Baku, 1964)
"The girl is in a hurry to a date"
"On remote shores" poem (1956)
"Welcoming overture" (1961)
Three symphonies for chamber orchestra (1960, 1962, 1963)

In 1968, Tofig Bakikhanov's Caspian Ballade ballet was staged at the Azerbaijan State Academic Opera and Ballet Theater . "Eastern poem" (1976), "Good and evil" (1990) compositions followed this ballet. 6 symphonies, 5 symphonic poems for different instruments: 24 sonatas, 26 concerts with symphonic orchestra, vocal and instrumental compositions.

Awards
Member of the Union of Azerbaijani Composers since 1958.
Honorary Art Worker of Azerbaijan since 1973.
Professor since 1983.
People's Artists of the Azerbaijan SSR (1990)
Doctor of Arts of the Azerbaijan National Creative Academy since 1966.
Abbasgulu agha Bakikhanov grant from 1994 to 2000.
Sign of Honour order (2000)
Order of Glory.
Honorary diploma of the President of Azerbaijan Republic, on 24 December 2010.

References

1930 births
Living people
Azerbaijani composers
Musicians from Baku
People's Artists of the Azerbaijan SSR
Soviet composers
Soviet male composers
Soviet Azerbaijani people
Azerbaijani nobility
Baku Academy of Music alumni
Recipients of the Order of Glory
20th-century male musicians
Bakikhanov family
Recipients of the Azerbaijan Democratic Republic 100th anniversary medal
Honored Art Workers of the Azerbaijan SSR